The Draughtsmen Clash (Le Damier – Papa national oyé!) is a 1996 film directed by Balufu Bakupa-Kanyinda of the Democratic Republic of the Congo.

Synopsis 
The Draughtsmen Clash is a wicked political satire about African dictators. It tells the story of the president of a fictitious African nation who spends a sleepless night playing checkers with a pot-smoking vagabond who claims to be the all-round champion. However, the rules of the game entail the opponents howling vulgar and foul obscenities at one another. The champion proceeds to insult, and trounce, the President. His reward, and his fate, will not surprise anyone.

Awards 
 Fespaco (Uagadugú) 1997
 Festival de Villeurbanne 1997
 Reel Black Talent Award (Toronto) 1997
 Festival Francófono de Namur 1998
 National Black Programming Award (Filadelfia) 1998

External links 

 

1996 films
Democratic Republic of the Congo comedy films
Creative Commons-licensed films
Democratic Republic of the Congo short films